Mickaël Sylvain Tırpan (born 23 October 1993) is a Belgian footballer who plays for Turkish club Kasımpaşa.

Career
Tırpan joined Süper Lig side Kasımpaşa on 24 January 2020.
He made his Süper Lig debut on week 19 encounter of 2019–20 season against Alanyaspor, in which Kasımpaşa lost 1–2, on 25 January 2020. He scored his first goal at Süper Lig on 30 October 2020, against Trabzonspor, where Kasımpaşa won 3–4.

On 10 January 2021 Tırpan joined Dutch club, Fortuna Sittard on loan until the end of the season.

Personal life
Tırpan was born in Anderlecht, Belgium. His father is Turkish and he is eligible to play for Turkey national team.

References

External links
Tırpan at TFF

1996 births
People from Anderlecht
Footballers from Brussels
Belgian people of Turkish descent
Living people
Belgian footballers
Association football defenders
F.C.V. Dender E.H. players
Francs Borains players
R.F.C. Seraing (1922) players
Royal Excel Mouscron players
K.A.S. Eupen players
K.S.C. Lokeren Oost-Vlaanderen players
Kasımpaşa S.K. footballers
Fortuna Sittard players
Challenger Pro League players
Belgian Pro League players
Süper Lig players
Eredivisie players
Belgian expatriate footballers
Expatriate footballers in Turkey
Belgian expatriate sportspeople in Turkey
Expatriate footballers in the Netherlands
Belgian expatriate sportspeople in the Netherlands